The Hanjiatuo Yangtze River Bridge  is a cable-stayed railway bridge over the Yangtze River in the Fuling District of Chongqing, China. The bridge carries the Chongqing-Lichuan Railway and was completed in 2012.

The bridge ranks among the longest cable-stayed bridges in the world.

See also
List of largest cable-stayed bridges
Yangtze River bridges and tunnels

References

External links
Creegc.com

Bridges in Chongqing
Bridges over the Yangtze River
Cable-stayed bridges in China
Bridges completed in 2012
Railway bridges in China